John "Jack" Doughty (October 1865 – April 1937) was a Welsh footballer who played as a forward. Born in Bilston, Staffordshire, to an Irish father and a Welsh mother, Doughty started his football career with Druids before joining Newton Heath in June 1886. He was in the Heathens team that first joined the Football Alliance in the 1889–90 season, and made his debut on 30 October 1886 against Fleetwood Rangers in the FA Cup. He left Newton Heath in 1891.

Doughty made his debut for the Wales national team in 1886, in a match against Scotland. He scored four goals in one match for Wales in a game against Ireland national football team in March 1888, a match in which his brother Roger, also a Newton Heath player, scored two goals. In total, Doughty only played eight times for Wales.

References

External links
Profile at StretfordEnd.co.uk
Profile at MUFCInfo.com

1865 births
1937 deaths
People from Bilston
Welsh footballers
Wales international footballers
Association football forwards
Druids F.C. players
Manchester United F.C. players
Hyde United F.C. players
Fairfield Athletic F.C. players
Football Alliance players